Amelus nigripennis is a species of beetle in the family Carabidae, the only species in the genus Amelus.

References

Lebiinae